Metia Interactive is a game development studio based in Auckland, New Zealand. They are a member of the NZGDA. Metia Interactive specialises in designing and creating game art assets, including modelling and texturing, as well as pre-rendered and realtime animations.

Metia is a licensed developer for the Sony PlayStation Portable. Their PlayStation Portable title, Cube, was awarded Runner Up for Best Unsigned Game (Professional) at the Australian Game Developers Conference, 2005. Cube is being published by D3 Publisher. The game features sound and music by New Zealand electronica band, Pitch Black.

Metia also had other titles in development, the mobile phone game Takaro, which was a futuristic action game. As well as The Guardian, a sci-fi adventure game for the PlayStation 3 and Xbox 360, which has the possibility to be the first Maori themed game for the video game console market, featuring a female Maori lead.

Metia also has a joint venture with Film Factory New Zealand to work on The Guardian, which additional to the game, has a feature film in development.

Games developed

 Cube: 3D Puzzle Mayhem - PSP 
 The Guardian - PS2
 SPARX - PC

References

External links 
 Official Website

Video game companies of New Zealand